Denmark participated in and won the Eurovision Song Contest 2013 with the song "Only Teardrops" written by Lise Cabble, Julia Fabrin Jakobsen and Thomas Stengaard. The song was performed by Emmelie de Forest. The Danish broadcaster DR organised the national final Dansk Melodi Grand Prix 2013 in order to select the Danish entry for the 2013 contest in Malmö, Sweden. Ten songs competed in a televised show where "Only Teardrops" performed by Emmelie de Forest was the winner as decided upon through the combination of jury voting and public voting over two rounds.

Denmark was drawn to compete in the first semi-final of the Eurovision Song Contest which took place on 14 May 2013. Performing during the show in position 5, "Only Teardrops" was announced among the top 10 entries of the first semi-final and therefore qualified to compete in the final on 18 May. It was later revealed that Denmark placed first out of the 16 participating countries in the semi-final with 167 points. In the final, Denmark performed in position 18 and placed first out of the 26 participating countries, winning the contest with 281 points. This was Denmark's third win in the Eurovision Song Contest; their last victory was in 2000.

Background 

Prior to the 2013 contest, Denmark had participated in the Eurovision Song Contest forty-one times since its first entry in 1957. In the 2012 contest, "Should've Known Better" performed by Soluna Samay qualified Denmark to the final placing twenty-third.

The Danish national broadcaster, DR, broadcasts the event within Denmark and organises the selection process for the nation's entry. DR confirmed their intentions to participate at the 2013 Eurovision Song Contest on 27 May 2012. Denmark has selected all of their Eurovision entries through the national final Dansk Melodi Grand Prix. On 10 July 2012, the broadcaster announced that Dansk Melodi Grand Prix 2013 would be organised in order to select Denmark's entry for the 2013 contest.

Before Eurovision

Dansk Melodi Grand Prix 2013 
Dansk Melodi Grand Prix 2013 was the 43rd edition of Dansk Melodi Grand Prix, the music competition that selects Denmark's entries for the Eurovision Song Contest. The event was held on 26 January 2013 at the Jyske Bank Boxen in Herning, hosted by Lise Rønne, Louise Wolff and Sofie Lassen-Kahlke and televised on DR1 as well as streamed online at the official DR website. The national final was watched by 1.785 million viewers in Denmark.

Format 
Ten songs competed in one show where the winner was determined over two rounds of voting. In the first round, the top three songs based on the combination of votes from a public vote and a five-member jury panel qualified to the superfinal. In the superfinal, the winner was determined again by the votes of the jury and public. Viewers were able to vote via SMS.

The five-member jury panel was composed of:
 Mich Hedin Hansen (Cutfather) – songwriter and music producer
 Lis Sørensen – singer
 Jørgen de Mylius – television and radio host, 23-times Danish Eurovision Song Contest commentator
 Maria Lucia – musical actress and singer
 Kato – DJ and music producer

Competing entries 
DR opened a submission period between 10 July 2012 and 24 September 2012 for artists and composers to submit their entries. The entertainment director for DR, Jan Lagermand Lundme, stated that the competition would seek out "songs that have a strong chorus". The broadcaster received a record breaking 692 entries during the submission period; the previous record was set in 2009 when the broadcaster received 684 entries. A selection committee selected eight songs from the entries submitted to the broadcaster, while two of the participants were invited to compete based on editorial considerations: Jack Rowan and Louise Dubiel. DR held a press meet and greet at the DR Byen in Copenhagen on 16 January 2013 where the competing artists and songs were announced and officially presented. Among the artists was Brinck who represented Denmark in the Eurovision Song Contest 2009.

Final
The final took place on 26 January 2013. In the first round of voting the top three advanced to the superfinal based on the votes of a five-member jury (50%) and a public vote (50%). In the superfinal, the winner, "Only Teardrops" performed by Emmelie de Forest, was selected by the public and jury vote. The viewers and the juries each had a total of 30 points to award in the superfinal. Each juror distributed their points as follows: 1, 2 and 3 points. The viewer vote was based on the percentage of votes each song achieved. For example, if a song gained 10% of the viewer vote, then that entry would be awarded 10% of 30 points rounded to the nearest integer: 3 points.

In addition to the performances of the competing entries, Danish Eurovision 2012 entrant Soluna Samay, British Eurovision Song Contest 1976 winner Brotherhood of Man, Irish Eurovision Song Contest 1980 and 1987 winner Johnny Logan and Swedish Eurovision Song Contest 1984 winner Herreys performed as the interval acts.

Promotion 
Emmelie de Forest made several appearances across Europe to specifically promote "Only Teardrops" as the Danish Eurovision entry. On 12 April, Emmelie de Forest appeared during the SVT1 programme Gomorron Sverige in Sweden. On 21 April, de Forest performed during the London Eurovision Party, which was held at the Shadow Lounge venue in London, United Kingdom and hosted by Nicki French and Paddy O'Connell.

At Eurovision
According to Eurovision rules, all nations with the exceptions of the host country and the "Big Five" (France, Germany, Italy, Spain and the United Kingdom) are required to qualify from one of two semi-finals in order to compete for the final; the top ten countries from each semi-final progress to the final. The European Broadcasting Union (EBU) split up the competing countries into six different pots based on voting patterns from previous contests, with countries with favourable voting histories put into the same pot. On 17 January 2013, a special allocation draw was held which placed each country into one of the two semi-finals, as well as which half of the show they would perform in. Denmark was placed into the first semi-final, to be held on 14 May 2013, and was scheduled to perform in the first half of the show.

Once all the competing songs for the 2013 contest had been released, the running order for the semi-finals was decided by the shows' producers rather than through another draw, so that similar songs were not placed next to each other. Denmark was set to perform in position 5, following the entry from Croatia and before the entry from Russia.

The two semi-finals and final were broadcast on DR1 with commentary by Ole Tøpholm. The Danish spokesperson, who announced the Danish votes during the final, was Sofie Lassen-Kahlke.

Semi-final 
Emmelie de Forest took part in technical rehearsals on 6 and 10 May, followed by dress rehearsals on 13 and 14 May. This included the jury show on 13 May where the professional juries of each country watched and voted on the competing entries.

The Danish performance featured Emmelie de Forest in a cream coloured loose tank dress designed by Danish designer Anja Elefteria and performing with two drummers, one of them who also played the penny whistle, and three backing vocalists. The stage colours were predominantly red, yellow and orange and the performance also featured a pyrotechnic fountain effect. The two drummers that joined Emmelie de Forest were Jacob Baagøe Thomsen and Morten Specht Larsen, while the three backing vocalists were: Anne Murillo, Heidi Degn and Anders Øhrstrøm.

At the end of the show, Denmark was announced as having finished in the top 10 and subsequently qualifying for the grand final. It was later revealed that Denmark placed first in the semi-final, receiving a total of 167 points.

Final 

Shortly after the first semi-final, a winners' press conference was held for the ten qualifying countries. As part of this press conference, the qualifying artists took part in a draw to determine which half of the grand final they would subsequently participate in. This draw was done in the order the countries appeared in the semi-final running order. Denmark was drawn to compete in the second half. Following this draw, the shows' producers decided upon the running order of the final, as they had done for the semi-finals. Denmark was subsequently placed to perform in position 18, following the entry from Hungary and before the entry from Iceland.

Emmelie de Forest once again took part in dress rehearsals on 17 and 18 May before the final, including the jury final where the professional juries cast their final votes before the live show. Emmelie de Forest performed a repeat of her semi-final performance during the final on 18 May. Denmark won the contest placing first with a score of 281 points. This was Denmark's third victory in the Eurovision Song Contest; their last victory was in 2000.

Voting 
Voting during the three shows consisted of 50 percent public televoting and 50 percent from a jury deliberation. The jury consisted of five music industry professionals who were citizens of the country they represent. This jury was asked to judge each contestant based on: vocal capacity; the stage performance; the song's composition and originality; and the overall impression by the act. In addition, no member of a national jury could be related in any way to any of the competing acts in such a way that they cannot vote impartially and independently. The following members comprised the Danish jury: television and radio host Jørgen de Mylius, singer and 2012 Danish Eurovision entrant Soluna Samay, producer Chief 1 (Lars Pedersen), singer and actress Kaya Brüel and singer Jimmy Colding.

Following the release of the full split voting by the EBU after the conclusion of the competition, it was revealed that Denmark had placed first with both the public televote and the jury vote in the semi-final. In the public vote, Denmark received an average rank of 3.33, while with the jury vote, Denmark received an average rank of 3.58. In the final, Denmark had also placed first with both the public televote and the jury vote. In the public vote, Denmark received an average rank of 4.97, while with the jury vote, Denmark received an average rank of 6.23.

Below is a breakdown of points awarded to Denmark and awarded by Denmark in the first semi-final and grand final of the contest. The nation awarded its 12 points to Russia in the semi-final and to Norway in the final of the contest.

Points awarded to Denmark

Points awarded by Denmark

References

2013
Countries in the Eurovision Song Contest 2013
Eurovision
Eurovision